Danny Walsh (born 21 May 1944) is a former soccer player who played as a winger for Hakoah. Born in England, he represented the Australia national team seven times.

References

Living people
1944 births
Australian soccer players
Footballers from Essex
Association football wingers
Australia international soccer players